William Daniel Merritt (January 31, 1872 – March 25, 1961) was an American college football player and attorney.

University of North Carolina
Merritt was a prominent end for the North Carolina Tar Heels football team of the University of North Carolina.

1892
Merritt was a substitute on the 1892 team which claims a Southern championship.

1895
He was selected All-Southern in 1895.

References

1872 births
1961 deaths
People from Person County, North Carolina
All-Southern college football players
North Carolina Tar Heels football players
American football ends
19th-century players of American football
American lawyers